Arthur Hughes (born 1992) is a British actor known for his roles as Ryan McDaniel in television series The Innocents and Ruairi Donovan in BBC Radio 4 series The Archers. His stage appearances include the role of Laurent in La Cage aux Folles at the Park Theatre, London and Phil in The Solid Life of Sugar Water with Graeae.

Hughes attended Aylesbury Grammar School,  and graduated in 2013 from the Royal Welsh College of Music & Drama. He has radial dysplasia affecting his right arm.

In 2022, Hughes played disability activist Alan Holdsworth in the BBC's Then Barbara Met Alan; The Independent's reviewer said that "Hughes is excellent as the emotionally unstable and tense Holdsworth". In the same year, he took the title role in the Royal Shakespeare Company's production of Richard III, being the first disabled actor to do so. The Guardian's reviewer said that "Hughes's Richard is every bit the schemer, dead-eyed and unmoved by the body count he leaves on the way to the throne, but he also has a smarmy mischief about him, delivering news of another dispatched victim in a breezy tone of voice and eking comic asides out of his character's darkness.

References

External links

1992 births
Living people
British male radio actors
British male stage actors
British male television actors
Alumni of the Royal Welsh College of Music & Drama
People educated at Aylesbury Grammar School
Actors with disabilities